Albert Elliott "Buster" Haywood (January 12, 1910 – April 19, 2000) was a Negro league baseball player and manager. He played for the Clowns in both Indianapolis and Cincinnati, the Birmingham Black Barons, and the New York Cubans. He won Most Valuable Player of the 1941 Denver Post Tournament. He worked a player/manager of the Clowns and was Hank Aaron's first professional manager. He also managed the Memphis Red Sox in 1954.

References

External links
 and Seamheads

1910 births
2000 deaths
Cincinnati Clowns players
Indianapolis Clowns players
Birmingham Black Barons players
New York Cubans players
African-American baseball managers
Negro league baseball managers
20th-century African-American sportspeople